Paula Elsa Jacobs (1932 – 26 June 2021) was a British actress whose television and film career spanned four decades.

Biography
Born in Liverpool in 1932 into a Jewish family, her father was J.P. Jacobs, whose company supplied all the elastic to Marks & Spencer. Jacobs made her first television appearance in Z-Cars in 1962, going on to play roles in Softly, Softly: Task Force (1972–1975), Shoestring (1979), Hammer House of Horror (1980), Mapp & Lucia (1985), Mrs Biggs in Porterhouse Blue (1987), The New Statesman (1989), Bergerac (1990), Maud Wilberforce in Jeeves and Wooster (1990), Brookside (1992), French and Saunders (1993), Coronation Street (1994), Casualty (1989–1995), Drop the Dead Donkey (1994–1998), Dalziel and Pascoe (2000), Midsomer Murders (2002), Agatha Christie's Poirot (2004) and Doctors (2008). 
 
Her film appearances include Birth of the Beatles (1979), An American Werewolf in London (1981), She'll Be Wearing Pink Pyjamas (1985), We Think the World of You (1988), Duel of Hearts (1991), The Remains of the Day (1993) and Tea with Mussolini (1999).

In 1953 in her native Liverpool she married the actor David Swift who on graduating from Cambridge worked for her father's company. She was the mother of actress Julia Swift and the mother-in-law of actor David Bamber. She and her late husband were trustees of the J P Jacobs Charitable Trust, set up in memory of her father.

Jacobs died on 26 June 2021 and she is buried with her husband David on the eastern side of Highgate Cemetery.

Filmography

References

External links
 
 Jacobs on TV.com
 

1932 births
2021 deaths
Burials at Highgate Cemetery
People from Liverpool
English television actresses
English film actresses
English stage actresses
English Jews
Jewish English actresses